Winter at the Sognefjord (Norwegian: Vinter ved Sognefjorden) is a painting by the Norwegian artist Johan Christian Dahl from 1827.

The picture is painted in oil on canvas and has the dimensions of 61.5 x 75.5 cm.

The picture is part of the collection of the National Museum of Art, Architecture and Design in Oslo, Norway.

Analysis
After a trip to Italy in 1820–1821, Johan Christian Dahl settled permanently in Dresden. There he drew a number of ideal Norwegian landscapes. From 1826 on, there was a change in his work reflecting new understanding for Norwegian landscape. Then he took a trip through Norway from Christiania to Telemark and Hardangervidda to the fjords of western Norway, his first trip to the mountains as a mature artist.

The motive was first drafted as a drawing during the trip. Steep slopes and vertical rock are depicted in the foreground. This painting is a tribute to the majestic Norwegian nature and the proud history of the nation.

References

Paintings by Johan Christian Dahl
1827 paintings
Paintings in the collection of the National Gallery (Norway)
Romantic art
Landscape paintings
European art